Animalize is the twelfth studio album by American rock band Kiss. It was released on September 13, 1984, by Mercury Records. The album marked the only appearance by lead guitarist Mark St. John, who replaced Vinnie Vincent in April 1984.

Background
At the time of the record's release, Gene Simmons was pursuing a career in acting. Paul Stanley was thus primarily in charge of the album's production and direction.

New guitarist Mark St. John stated that when recording the album, he had utilized his Rockman gear and that heavy equalization was used to take the "Boston" sound out of the recording.

St. John was forced to temporarily leave Kiss before the subsequent tour after being diagnosed with reactive arthritis. While he accompanied the group on tour and convalesced, the group hired Bruce Kulick as a temporary replacement. Kulick gelled with the band's personalities and playing styles better than St. John; by November 1984, St. John was fired and replaced by Kulick permanently, making him the third lead guitarist to exit the group in two years.

When asked what "animalize" meant, Stanley said that people were starting to become more like computers and that "making music by pressing buttons" was no fun.

Reception

Commercial
In a continuation of Kiss' commercial resurgence which had begun with 1983's Lick It Up, Animalize was certified platinum by the RIAA. It was the biggest-selling Kiss album since 1979's Dynasty.

"Heaven's on Fire" became the biggest hit from the album (as well as one of the only songs to survive on the band's live setlist after the '80s), and its music video received heavy MTV rotation. It is also the only music video appearance of Mark St. John.

Critical
Critics and longtime fans, however, criticized the band's continued move towards a glam metal style on Animalize. Simmons fell into increasing conflict with his bandmates during this period for a variety of reasons. Most of this revolved around his perceived lack of commitment to the band and preoccupation with numerous outside projects, including producing and managing other rock groups such as Black 'n Blue (of whom Tommy Thayer was a member at the time), a co-starring role in Runaway (1984), bit parts in films like Trick or Treat (1986), and an assortment of business ventures.

Guitar World magazine later placed the album on their list of "New Sensations: 50 Iconic Albums That Defined 1984".

Track listing
All credits adapted from the original release.

Personnel
Kiss
Paul Stanley – vocals, rhythm guitar; bass guitar on "I've Had Enough (Into the Fire)", producer, back cover photo concept
Gene Simmons – vocals, bass guitar, associate producer
Eric Carr – drums, percussion, backing vocals
Mark St. John – lead guitar

Additional musicians
Bruce Kulick – guitar solo on "Lonely Is the Hunter", additional guitar on "Murder in High-Heels"
Jean Beauvoir – bass guitar on "Get All You Can Take", "Under the Gun" and "Thrills in the Night" 
Desmond Child − backing vocals
Allan Schwartzberg – drum overdubs
Mitch Weissman − additional guitar on "Get All You Can Take" and "While the City Sleeps", bass guitar on "Murder in High-Heels"

Production
Chris Minto – engineer
Timothy Crich – assistant engineer
Dave Wittman – additional recording, mixing
Michael James Jackson – drum recording producer
George Marino – mastering at Sterling Sound, New York
Bernard Vidal – back cover photography
Howard Marks Advertising – design

Charts

Album

Singles

Certifications

See also
Animalize Live Uncensored

References

External links

Kiss (band) albums
1984 albums
Albums produced by Paul Stanley
Mercury Records albums
Vertigo Records albums
Casablanca Records
Albums recorded at MSR Studios